The Berlin Pleiades was a group of seven masters of German chess in the 19th century. They are named after the star constellation the Pleiades.

The members of the Berlin Pleiades were: 
 Paul Rudolf von Bilguer, Army Lieutenant and author of the Handbuch des Schachspiels, the most influential chess book for 90 years;
 Dr. Ludwig Bledow, teacher of mathematics and the Pleiades co-founder;
 Wilhelm Hanstein, civil servant;
 Bernhard Horwitz, painter;
 Baron Tassilo von Heydebrand und der Lasa, later became a Prussian diplomat and chess historian;
 Carl Mayet, barrister and judge;
 Carl Schorn, painter.

References

Chess in Germany

Chess organizations
History of chess
19th century in Berlin